Keith M. Landy (ca. 1950-2017) was a Canadian lawyer and former president of the Canadian Jewish Congress.

Landy was born in Coventry, England and moved with his family to South Africa, then immigrated to Canada where he was educated at the University of Windsor's law school and is senior and founding partner in the Toronto law firm of Landy, Marr, Kats LLP.

Landy was national president of the Canadian Jewish Congress from 2001 to 2004. He had previously been chair of the CJC, Ontario Region from 1998 to 2001 and held various other offices in the organization. He also served as a vice-president of the World Jewish Congress and a member of the Executive Committee of the Conference on Jewish Material Claims. In 2008, he served as chair of the CJC's War Crimes Committee.

As Chair of CJC Ontario, Landy successfully lobbied for passage of the Holocaust Memorial Day – Yom Hashoah- Act by the Ontario Legislature. He has also served as a delegate to the United Nations' World Conference Against Racism, Racial Discrimination and Xenophobia in Durban, South Africa. In April 2004, he was a member of the official Canadian governmental delegation to the Organization for Security and Cooperation in Europe (OSCE) conference on antisemitism.

Landy died in early 2017 at the age of 66.  He has two children, Michelle and Josh, along with three grandchildren.

Honours
In 2002, Landy was a recipient of The Queen's Golden Jubilee Medal. In 2005, he received The Lincoln Alexander Award from the Law Society of Upper Canada honoring his commitment to the public and community service and to the people of Ontario for his work for human rights and religious tolerance.

References

Canadian Jews
Canadian Jewish Congress
Canadian people of English-Jewish descent
British emigrants to South Africa
English Jews
Lawyers in Ontario
People from Coventry
People from Toronto
South African emigrants to Canada
South African Jews
2017 deaths
Year of birth missing